Ali Huzaif (born 12 March 1999) is a Ghanaian professional footballer who plays as a forward for Ghanaian Premier League side Dreams F.C.

Career

Bofoakwa Tano 
Hafaiz scored 12 goals while playing in the Ghana Division II League before earning a switch to Bofoakwa Tano in 2019. Hazaif played for Bofoakwa Tano in the Ghana Division One League during the 2019–20 season. He scored 5 goals before the league was suspended because of the COVID-19 pandemic.

Dreams FC 
In May 2020, Hafaiz was signed by Ghana Premier League side Dreams FC, whilst the league had been suspended and was yet to resume. He signed a 3-year deal after completing his mandatory medicals. The league was however cancelled due to the COVID-19 pandemic. Ahead of the 2020–21 Ghana Premier League season, he was named on the team's squad list as the league was set to restart in November 2020. On 16 November 2020, he made his debut, playing 72 minutes before being substituted for Abel Manomey in a goalless draw against International Allies.

References

External links 
 

Living people
1999 births
Association football forwards
Ghanaian footballers
Ghana Premier League players
Dreams F.C. (Ghana) players